Kevin Kennedy (born 21 January 1945) is a New Zealand cricketer. He played in one List A and thirty first-class matches for Northern Districts from 1964 to 1975.

See also
 List of Northern Districts representative cricketers

References

External links
 

1945 births
Living people
New Zealand cricketers
Northern Districts cricketers
Cricketers from Gisborne, New Zealand